Ovidiu Cornea (born 25 February 1980 in Făgăraș) is a Romanian competitive rower. He competed at the 2004 Summer Olympics in the men's coxless four event. At the 2001 World Rowing Championships he won a gold medal in the men's coxed eight and at the 1999 World Rowing Championships he won a bronze medal in the coxed four event.

See also 
 Romania at the 2004 Summer Olympics

References 

1980 births
Living people
Romanian male rowers
People from Făgăraș
Olympic rowers of Romania
Rowers at the 2004 Summer Olympics
World Rowing Championships medalists for Romania